Polaromonas vacuolata is a psychrophilic bacterium with gas vesicles from the genus Polaromonas, which was isolated from  Antarctica. Colonies of P. vacuolata are snowy white.

References

Comamonadaceae
Bacteria described in 1996